The March Hare is a character in Lewis Carroll's Alice's Adventures in Wonderland.

March Hare or The March Hare may also refer to:

 March Hare (band), featuring Stuart Leathwood of The Koobas
 March Hare (festival), a Canadian poetry festival
 The March Hare (1919 film), a British silent comedy film 
 The March Hare (1921 film), a lost American silent film
 The March Hare (1956 film), a British comedy film

See also
 
 Mad as a March hare, an English idiomatic phrase